T-Systems Multimedia Solutions GmbH (T-Systems MMS) is a German IT service and IT consulting firm headquartered in Dresden. The company provides consulting and software development services to medium and large organizations and has offices in Berlin, Bonn, Dresden, Hamburg, Stuttgart, Munich, Leipzig and Jena. In 2017, T-Systems MMS had 1900 employees and revenue of 173 Million EUR.

T-Systems MMS is a wholly owned subsidiary of T-Systems International GmbH and is considered part of the Deutsche Telekom Concern.

History 
The organization was founded in 1995 under the name “Multimedia Software GmbH Dresden” as a wholly owned subsidiary of Deutsche Telekom. The purpose of the company was to develop software solutions for interactive television. Starting with CD-ROMs and interactive kiosks, the company later developed Internet and e-commerce solutions. Today, T-Systems MMS provides software solutions for clients from different sectors such as digital commerce, websites, intranet, social marketing, big data, mobile solutions, retail, security and Industry 4.0. The services provided by T-Systems MMS range from consulting and project management to software development and technical support services.

Executive board 
T-Systems MMS has two managing directors: Ralf Pechmann who is responsible for marketing and clients, and Marcus Gaube as head of sales.

Former managing directors:
 Friedhelm Theis (1995–1998)
 Joachim Niemeier (1995–2005)
 Klaus Radermacher (1999–2002 and 2005–2007)
 Jens Nebendahl (2007–2013)
 Helmut Binder (2007–2008)
 Rolf Werner (2013–2015)
 Peter Klingenburg (2006–2018)
 Susanne Heger (2013–2019)
 Sven Erdmann (2019-2020)

References

External links 
 T-Systems MMS home page

Deutsche Telekom
ICT service providers
Information technology consulting firms of Germany
International information technology consulting firms
Companies based in Dresden
Companies established in 1995